Ronald William Lacey (28 September 1935 – 15 May 1991) was an English actor. He made numerous television and film appearances over a 30-year period. His roles included Harris in Porridge (1977), Frankie in the Bud Spencer comedy Charleston (1978), SD agent Sturmbannführer Arnold Ernst Toht in Raiders of the Lost Ark (1981) and the Bishop of Bath and Wells in Blackadder II (1986).

Early life
Lacey was born and grew up in Harrow, Middlesex. He received his formal education at Harrow Weald Grammar School. After a brief period of national service in the British Armed Forces, he enrolled at the London Academy of Music and Dramatic Art to train as an actor.

Career
Lacey began his acting career in 1959 in a television play, The Secret Agent. His first significant performance was at the Royal Court Theatre in 1962's Chips with Everything. Lacey had an unusual 'pug' look, with beady eyes, an upturned nose, liver lips, an overbite, receding chin and no brows. He could scream at a very high pitch. This unique combination of features landed him repeatedly in bizarre roles on both stage and screen, often as seedy, creepy villains. Together with his Welsh background, it helped qualify him for the role of Dylan Thomas, which he played on BBC2 in what critic Clive James described as a "bravura performance".

Lacey performed on British television throughout the 1960s and 1970s, with roles spanning from a part in Kenneth Clark's Civilisation television series, as the gravedigger, in a re-enactment of the gravedigger scene from Hamlet, with Ian Richardson as Hamlet and Patrick Stewart as Horatio, to a guest shot as the "Strange Young Man" in The Avengers episode "The Joker", and as Harris in the sitcom Porridge, with the latter finally landing him in the role for which his unusual physical characteristics could be repeatedly used to full advantage. Disappointed with his acting career by the late 1970s, he began to consider starting a talent agency. Spielberg then cast him as the Nazi agent Arnold Toht in Raiders of the Lost Ark. He followed this with a series of various villain roles for the next five to six years: Sahara with Brooke Shields, and 1985's Red Sonja with Arnold Schwarzenegger, in addition to 1982's Firefox with Clint Eastwood, in which he played a Russian scientist helping the West behind the Iron Curtain. He then made two movies for Ice International Films: Assassinator starring alongside John Ryan and George Murcell, and Into the Darkness, starring with Donald Pleasence, John Ryan, and Brett Paul.  He performed comic monologues on The Green Tie on the Little Yellow Dog, which was recorded 1982, and broadcast by Channel 4 in 1983.

Lacey played a number of villainous roles and was known for his trademark smile, which would turn into a gleaming malicious leer. He also had a rather large mole on his left cheek, which he chose not to have removed, as well as a highly distinctive voice. In 1983's Trenchcoat, he used the mole as a beauty mark in his role as Princess Aida, a mysterious and sleazy drag queen on the island of Malta. His other drag role was in Invitation to the Wedding from 1985, in which he played a husband/wife couple.

Personal life

Lacey married twice, first to the actress Mela White in 1962 (she married him under the name Brompton as this was her second marriage). They had two children, actors Rebecca Lacey and Jonathan Lacey. Following their divorce, he married Joanna Baker in 1972, with whom he had a son.

Death
Lacey was diagnosed with terminal liver cancer on 25 April 1991. He died less than one month later, on 15 May 1991, at the age of 55.

Filmography

Films
 1962 The Boys as Billy Herne
 1963 Doctor in Distress as Café Customer (uncredited)
 1964 Of Human Bondage as "Matty" Mathews
 1964 The Comedy Man as First Assistant Director (uncredited)
 1965 Catch Us If You Can as Yeano, Beatnik
 1967 The White Bus
 1967 The Fearless Vampire Killers as Village Idiot
 1967 How I Won the War as Spool
 1969 Take a Girl Like You as Graham
 1969 Otley as Curtis
 1970 Tintin and the Temple of the Sun as Thompson (English version, voice, uncredited)
 1971 Say Hello to Yesterday as Car Park Attendant (uncredited)
 1971 Macbeth as Macbeths Man, Killed Banquo (uncredited)
 1971 Crucible of Terror as Michael Clare
 1972 Disciple of Death as Parson
 1973 Gawain and the Green Knight as Oswald
 1973 The Final Programme as "Shades"
 1975 Mister Quilp as Harris
 1976 The Likely Lads as Ernie
 1977 Charleston as Frankie
 1979 Zulu Dawn as Norris Newman
 1980 Nijinsky as Léon Bakst
 1981 Raiders of the Lost Ark as Major Arnold Ernst Toht
 1982 Firefox as Dr. Maxim Ilyich Semelovsky
 1982 Tangiers as Wedderburn
 1983 Invitation to the Wedding as Clara / Charles Eatwell
 1983 Trenchcoat as Princess Aida
 1983 Yellowbeard as Man With Parrot
 1983 Sahara as "Beg"
 1984 Making the Grade as Nicky
 1984 Sword of the Valiant as Oswald
 1984 The Adventures of Buckaroo Banzai Across the 8th Dimension as President Widmark
 1984 The Bengal Lancers!
 1985 Flesh + Blood as Cardinal
 1985 Red Sonja as Ikol
 1985 Minder on the Orient Express as Harry Ridler
 1986 Aces Go Places 4 as Leader of the villains
 1986 Sky Bandits as Fritz
 1986 Lone Runner as Misha
 1986 Into the Darkness as Stewart Andrew Golding
 1988 Jailbird Rock as Warden Bauman
 1988 Manifesto as The Conductor
 1988 Dawn of an Evil Millennium
 1989 Indiana Jones and the Last Crusade as Heinrich Himmler (uncredited)
 1989 Valmont as José
 1989 Stalingrad as Winston Churchill
 1992 The Assassinator as Stewart
 1992 Landslide as Fred Donner
 1993 Angely smerti (final film role)

TV
 1960 Deadline Midnight as Jensen
 1961 A Chance of Thunder as Johnny Travers
 1964 The Likely Lads as Ernie
 1965 Day Out for Lucy
 1965 Barnaby Spoot and the Exploding Whoopee Cushion as Justin Fribble
 1965 Fable as Len
 1965 Gideon's Way as Jerry Blake
 1966 Who's a Good Boy Then? as Billy Oates
 1967 Boa Constrictor as Frankie "Three"
 1967 Great Expectations as Orlick
 1967 The Avengers as Strange Young Man (episode "The Joker")
 1968 The Avengers as Humbert (parody of Peter Lorre) (episode "Legacy of Death")
 1965-1968 Theatre 625 – "Mille miglia", "The Burning Bush", "Firebrand", "The Nutter"
 1968 Game, Set and Match
 1968 Civilisation – Episode 6: Protest and Communication  as Grave Digger (Shakespeare's Hamlet)
 1969 It Wasn't Me as George
 1969 Randall and Hopkirk (Deceased)
 1969 Target Generation as Joe Manx
 1969 These Men Are Dangerous
 1970 The Adventures of Don Quick as Sergeant Sam Czopanser
 1970 The Vessel of Wrath (1970) as Controleur
 1970 Catweazle as Ted "Tearful Ted"
 1971-1972 Jason King as Ryland
 1972 The Protectors (1 episode King Con) as Cribbe
 1973 Colditz (1 Episode Murder?) as Major Zibnek
 1973 Last of the Summer Wine as Walter
 1973 The Adventures of Don Quixote as Monk
 1973 Whatever Happened to the Likely Lads? as Ernie
 1975 The Fight Against Slavery as Charles James Fox
 1975 The Sweeney (Thou Shalt Not Kill!) as Barry Monk
 1976 Thriller (Episode The Next Victim) as Bartlett
 1976 Our Mutual Friend as Mr. Venus
 1976 The New Avengers as Harry "Hong Kong Harry"
 1976 A Story to Frighten the Children as Lang
 1976 The Duchess of Duke Street (Episode nine: As art dealer) as Mr. Shephard
 1977 Porridge as Harris
 1978 All Creatures Great and Small "The Last Furlong" as Stewie Brannon
 1978 Dylan (TV play) as Dylan Thomas
 1978 The Mayor of Casterbridge (mini series) as Jopp
 1979 Blakes 7 (1 episode "Killer") as Tynus
 1979 Tropic (TV series) as Geoffrey Turvey
 1981 Tiny Revolutions
 1982 P.O.S.H as Mr. Vicarage
 1983 Hart to Hart ("Hostage Harts") 
 1983 The Hound of the Baskervilles as Inspector Lestrade
 1983 The Rothko Conspiracy
 1984 Magnum, P.I. as Archer Hayes
 1985 Connie as Crawder
 1985 Minder on the Orient Express as Harry Ridler
 1985 Blackadder II as The Bishop of Bath and Wells
 1987 The Sign of Four as Thaddeus Sholto / Bartholomew Sholto
 1988 The Great Escape II: The Untold Story as Winston Churchill
 1989 The Nightmare Years as Emil Luger
 1990 Face to Face as Dr. Brinkman
 1991 The Strauss Dynasty as Bauer
Haggard TV Series 1990

References

External links
 

1935 births
1991 deaths
20th-century English male actors
Alumni of the London Academy of Music and Dramatic Art
Deaths from cancer in England
Deaths from liver cancer
English male film actors
English male television actors
English people of Welsh descent
People from Harrow, London